Grindheim may refer to:

People
Christian Grindheim (born 1983), a Norwegian footballer

Places
Grindheim, a former municipality in Vest-Agder county, Norway
Grindheim, a small farm area in the northern part of Byremo in Audnedal municipality in Vest-Agder county, Norway
Bjelland og Grindum, a former municipality in Vest-Agder county, Norway
Grindheim Church (Agder), a church in Audnedal municipality in Agder county, Norway
Grindheim Church (Vestland), a church in Etne municipality in Vestland county, Norway